Miri Division is one of the twelve administrative divisions of Sarawak, Malaysia.

Geography
It has a total area of 26,777.1 square kilometres, and is the second largest division after Kapit Division. The seat of this division is the city of Miri.

Miri Division consists of two districts: Miri and Marudi.

Population
The population of Miri Division (year 2000 census) was 316,400. Ethnically, the population was  Iban, Chinese, Malay (mostly Bruneian and Kedayan), Melanau, Kayan, Kenyah, Lun Bawang and Kelabit. Due to the petroleum industry, there is also a large foreign worker population.

Economy
The economy is largely based on petroleum and natural gas extraction from both onshore and offshore wells, and related petroleum refining, liquefied natural gas and chemical production. Another major industry is timber processing from Miri's huge tropical rainforest. Processed wood products, rather than log export has been given priority by the government. Agriculture is includes oil palm, rubber, and pepper as the main products. Tourism, particularly ecotourism, is a growing component of the economy.

Protected areas
 Gunung Mulu National Park
 Loagan Bunut National Park
 Miri-Sibuti Coral Reef National Park
 Niah National Park
 Pulong Tau National Park
 Usun Apau National Park

Administration

Members of Parliament

External links 
 - Web page about Miri City
 Miri Tourism